Caister Academy, formerly known as Caister High School, is a coeducational secondary school located in the small seaside village of Caister-on-Sea in Norfolk, England.

History
Caister Academy is a mixed school for 11 to 16-year-old pupils which has held specialist Arts College status since 2002. Caister Academy is located on Windsor Road on the coast. They have recently updated the sports hall.

Caister High School received a devastating Ofsted report in May 2014, where it was said to require improvement in all categories.
The school converted to academy status on 1 February 2015 and is sponsored by the Creative Education Trust. A new principal, Michelle Strong, was appointed and made the changes recommended at the preceding school's inspection, leaving in 2018 when the transformation was completed.

Notable alumni
Danny Crow, former footballer

References

External links
Caister Academy official website

Educational institutions established in 2015
2015 establishments in England
Secondary schools in Norfolk
Academies in Norfolk
Caister-on-Sea